Yūta, Yuta or Yuuta is a common masculine Japanese given name.

Possible writings
Yūta can be written using different combinations of kanji characters. Some examples: 

勇太, "courage, thick"
勇汰, "courage, excessive"
勇多, "courage, many"
雄太, "masculinity, thick"
雄汰, "masculinity, excessive"
雄多, "masculinity, many"
友太, "friend, thick"
友汰, "friend, excessive"
友多, "friend, many"
有太, "possessing/having, thick"
有汰, "possessing/having, excessive"
有多, "possessing/having, many"
裕太, "abundant, thick"
裕汰, "abundant, excessive"
裕多, "abundant, many"
悠太, "long time, thick"
悠汰, "long time, excessive"
悠多, "long time, many"

The name can also be written in hiragana ゆうた or katakana ユウタ.

Notable people with the name
, Japanese footballer
, Japanese baseball player
, Japanese footballer
, Japanese long-distance runner
, Japanese actor, singer, songwriter and model
, Russian sumo wrestler
, Japanese footballer
, Japanese footballer
, Japanese actor
, Japanese golfer
, Japanese footballer
Yuta Iwasada (born 1991), Japanese baseball player
, Japanese Go player
, Japanese actor
, Japanese baseball player
, Japanese footballer
, Japanese basketball player
, Japanese shogi player
, Japanese footballer
, Japanese hurdler
, Japanese kickboxer
, Japanese footballer
, Japanese footballer
, Japanese actor and voice actor
, Japanese baseball player
, Japanese member of Korean boy group NCT and its sub-unit NCT 127
Yuta Nakano (footballer) (中野 裕太, born 1989), Japanese footballer
, Japanese music composer and arranger
Yuta Nakazawa (中沢 佑太, born 1972), Japanese footballer
, Japanese baseball player
, Japanese actor
, Japanese mixed martial artist
, Japanese footballer
, Japanese footballer
, Japanese basketball player
, Japanese actor
, Japanese footballer
, Japanese basketball player
, Japanese badminton player
, Japanese ski jumper
, Japanese judoka
, Japanese volleyball player

Fictional characters
, protagonist of the manga series Mermaid Saga
, a character in the manga series Kimi to Boku
, a character in the video game Danganronpa Another Episode: Ultra Despair Girls
, a character in the anime series SSSS.Gridman
Yuta Okkotsu (乙骨 憂太), protagonist of anime movie Jujutsu Kaisen 0, and second year student in Jujutsu Kaisen anime series.
, protagonist of the light novel series Chūnibyō Demo Koi ga Shitai!

See also
Yuta, alternative name for a mokoshi, Japanese architectural feature

Japanese masculine given names